Vitória Futebol Clube is a Portuguese sports club from the city of Setúbal. Popularly known as Vitória de Setúbal, the club was born under the original name Sport Victoria from the ashes of the small Bonfim Foot-Ball Club.

When it comes to main achievements in Portugal, Vitória de Setúbal have won six trophies: three Taça de Portugal and one Taça da Liga. Internationally, Vitória have won a Small Club World Cup and an Iberian Cup. Historically, it is one of the most decorated clubs in the country, apart from the Big Three.

History

Vitória de Setúbal played in the inaugural Campeonato da Liga in 1934–35.

In 1964–65, Vitória de Setúbal won their first Taca de Portugal, beating holders Benfica 3–1 in the final. After losing 1–0 to Braga in the next season's final, Vitória won the 1967 final by beating Académica de Coimbra 3–2 after extra-time.

Vitoria competed in the European Cup-Winners' Cup in 1965-66 (losing 4–2 on aggregate in the first round to AGF Aarhus), and 1967-68 (losing 7–3 on aggregate to Bayern Munich in the second round).

Vitória Setubal played in the Fairs Cup in 1969–70, knocking Liverpool out in the second round. In the next round, they were eliminated 2–1 on aggregate by Hertha BSC.

In the 1973–74 season, Vitória de Setúbal finished in third place, four points behind champions Sporting CP.

After another yo-yo period from the mid-1980s to the mid-2000s, Vitória returned to the Portuguese top flight for the 2004–05 season and have remained there since. The same season saw them win their third Cup, beating holders Benfica 2–1 in the final on 29 May. On 13 August, the two clubs played the Super Cup against each other at the Estádio do Algarve, with Benfica winning 1–0. On 14 May 2006, Vitória lost the cup final by one goal to FC Porto.

On 22 March 2008, Vitória won the Taça da Liga for the first time. In the final, they defeated Sporting on penalties following a goalless draw; on-loan goalkeeper Eduardo saved three times. Ten years later, the final went to penalties against the same opponent, who won this time. Vitória avoided relegation by one point in 2019–20, but due to failure to gain a licence for the new season, they were administratively relegated to the third-tier Campeonato de Portugal.

Stadium
Vitória plays at the Estádio do Bonfim, which was inaugurated in 1962 and has a capacity of 18,964.

Honours
Source:

Taça de Portugal
Winners (3): 1964–65, 1966–67, 2004–05

Taça da Liga
Winners (1): 2007–08

Small Club World Cup
Winners (1): 1970

 Recopa Ibérica
Winners (1): 2005

Players

Current squad

Out on loan

References

External links

  
 Vitoria Setubal results and fixtures at Soccerbase

 
Association football clubs established in 1910
Vitoria FC
1910 establishments in Portugal
Taça de Portugal winners
Primeira Liga clubs
Liga Portugal 2 clubs
Sport in Setúbal District